Jock William Gaynor (September 14, 1929 – April 2, 1998) was an American television actor and producer. He was known for playing the role of Deputy Marshal Heck Martin in the first season of the American western television series, Outlaws.

Life and career 
Gaynor was born in Queens, New York, the son of Louise and Ira a police officer. He was introduced to public performance by playing the piano as a child. Gaynor served in the United States Air Force from October 25, 1950 to February 25, 1954. He also worked as an artist, professional baseball player and stage designer, working on plays, stock companies and television programs. Gaynor began his acting career in 1960, joining the cast of western television series Outlaws for its first season as Deputy Marshal Heck Martin.  He was not liked by other cast members, his character did not appeal to the viewers, and he only appeared in nine episodes before being replaced by Wynn Pearce.

Gaynor continued appearing in television programs, with his credits including Voyage to the Bottom of the Sea, Rawhide, Mission: Impossible, Batman, The Life and Legend of Wyatt Earp, The Invaders, Iron Horse, Coronet Blue and Colt .45. His only film credit was starring in the 1974 film The Deathhead Virgin. Gaynor also played the recurring role of Dr. William Scott in the television soap opera The Doctors. He retired in 1986, his last television credit being in Knight Rider.

Death 
Gaynor died in April 1998 in Los Angeles, California, at the age of 68.

References

External links 

Rotten Tomatoes profile

1929 births
1998 deaths
People from Queens, New York
Male actors from New York (state)
American male television actors
20th-century American male actors
American television producers
American soap opera actors
American male soap opera actors
American baseball players
American set designers
American artists
Western (genre) television actors